The Federal Art Project (1935–1943) of the Works Progress Administration was the largest of the New Deal art projects. As many as 10,000 artists were employed to create murals, easel paintings, sculpture, graphic art, posters, photography, Index of American Design documentation, theatre scenic design, and arts and crafts. Artists were paid $23.60 a week; tax-supported patrons and institutions paid only for materials. The Federal Art Project also operated community art centers throughout the country where artists worked and educated others.

Artists who worked only for comparable but distinctly separate New Deal art projects administered by the United States Department of the Treasury are not listed.

A

 William Abbenseth
 Berenice Abbott
 Ida York Abelman
 Gertrude Abercrombie
 Benjamin Abramowitz
 Lillian Adelman
 Edward J. Ades
 Louis Agostini
 Abe Ajay
 Ernest Maxell Albert
 Ivan Albright
 Maxine Albro
 Anna Aloisi
 Simon Alshets
 Charles Alston
 Nicholas Amantea
 Giuseppe Amato
 Harold Ambellan
 Arthur Ames
 Jean Goodwin Ames
 Harold Anchel
 Carlos Anderson
 Nicholas Angeletti
 Charlotte Angus
 Alexis Arapoff
 Luis Arenal
 Bruce Ariss
 Emil Armin
 Victor Arnautoff
 Whitney Atchley
 Darrel Austin
 Ralph Austin
 Wendell Austin
 Sheva Ausubel
 Frances Avery
 George Avison
 Austin Ayers

B

 John W. Backstrom
 Jozef Bakos
 Leah Balsham
 Gilbert Banever
 Henry Bannarn
 Belle Baranceanu
 Harold Barbour
 Phil Bard
 Patrociño Barela
 Erik Barger
 Ruth M. Barnes
 Will Barnet
 Norman Barr
 Oliver L. Barrett
 Charles Barrows
 Richmond Barthé
 Emily Barto
 Isabel Bate
 Herbert Bayer
 William Baziotes
 Lester Beall
 Klir Beck
 Fred G. Becker
 Harrison Begay
 Enid Bell
 Milton R. Bellin
 Daisy Maud Bellis
 Lampbert Bemelmann
 Rainey Bennett
 Edward Benoit
 John H. Benson
 Leslie Benson
 Ahron Ben-Shmuel
 Andrew Berger
 Aaron Berkman
 Sarah Berman
 Henry Bernstein 
 Jolan Gross Bettelheim
 Leon Bibel
 Robert Blackburn
 Mary Blahitka
 Arnold Blanch
 Lucile Blanch
 Marie Bleck
 Julius Bloch
 Lucienne Bloch
 Dorothy Block
 Walton Blodgett
 George Bobholz
 Vera Bock
 Aaron Bohrod
 Ilya Bolotowsky
 Samuel Bookatz
 Cameron Booth
 Mortimer Borne
 Ralph Boyer
 Dorr Bothwell
 Hugh Botts
 Tom Boutis
 Harry Bowden
 Raymond Sceptre Boynton
 Adele Brandeis
 Dayton Brandfield
 Louise Brann
 Gladys Brannigan
 Ben Braun
 Joan van Breeman
 Raymond Breinin
 Louis Breslow
 George T. Brewster
 Lester Bridaham
 Edgar Britton
 King D. Brock
 Manuel Bromberg
 James Brooks
 Bob Brown
 Samuel E. Brown
 Samuel J. Brown Jr.  
 Byron Browne
 Ann Gene Buckley
 John Buczak
 Beniamino Bufano
 Charles Ragland Bunnell
 E. A. Burbank
 John E. Burdick
 Benjamin Burgoyne
 Robert W. Burke
 Selma Burke
 Leslie Bryan Burroughs
 Frank Butler
 Redmond Byron

C

 Letterio Calapai
 Vincent Campanella
 Leon Carlin
 Leon Carroll
 Samuel Cashwan
 Thomas Cavaliere
 Giorgio Cavallon
 Daniel Celentano
 Pedro Cervantez
 Lucille Chabot
 Glenn Chamberlain
 Dane Chanase
 Ruth Chaney
 Edouard Chassaing
 Eugene Chodorow
 Fay Chong
 David Paul Chun
 Frank Cirigliano
 Claude Clark
 Paul Clemens
 Eleanor Coen 
 Max Arthur Cohn
 Francis Colburn
 Vernon Herbert Coleman
 John Collins
 Pat Collins
 James H. P. Conlon
 George Constant
 Mariano Corda
 Jesse Cornplanter
 Richard V. Correll
 Eldzier Cortor
 Francis J. Costa
 Vito Covelli
 Arthur Covey
 Alfred D. Crimi
 Francis Criss
 Allan Crite
 Flora Crockett
 Robert Cronbach
 Beatrice Cuming
 John Steuart Curry
 Marian Curtis
 Philip Campbell Curtis

D

 Warren Dahler
 June Dale
 Homer Dana
 Joseph Danysh
 Elizabeth Hoffman Dasch
 Abraham Mark Datz
 James Daugherty
 Stuart Davis
Carson Davenport
 Hubert Davis
 Wyatt Davis
 Harold Mallette Dean
 Victor DeCarlo
 Emanuel DeColas
 Mathilde De Cordoba
 Elizabeth Deering
 Adolf Dehn
 Willem de Kooning
 Robert Delson
 Joseph De Martini
 Salvatore DeMaio
 Joseph De Mers
 Frederick Dertwiller
 Helen Blackmur Dickson
 Edward DiGennero
 Burgoyne Diller
 Nathaniel Dirk
 Isabella Ruth Doerfler
 Isami Doi
 Rex Dolmith
 Marguerite Redman Dorgeloh
 Adrian Dornbush
 Murna Dunkle
 Arthur E. Dunn
 Alexander Dux
 Mabel Dwight
 Carlos Dyer

E

 George Frederic Earle
 Stuart Edie
 Emmet Edwards
 Ruth Egri
 Fritz Eichenberg
 Arthur Elder
 Martha Elliott
 Jacob Elshin
 Irene Emery
 George Pearse Ennis
 Angna Enters
 Arthur Esner
 Philip Evergood

F

 Claire Falkenstein
 Dorathy Farr
 Harold Knickerbocker Faye
 Stanford Fenelle
 Louis Ferstadt
 Thyrsis Field
 Alexander Finta
 Thomas Flavell
 Joseph Fleck
 Anne Fletcher
 LeRoy Walter Flint
 Lawrence Flynn
 Seymour Fogel
 Paul Fontaine
 Donald Forbes
 Helen Katharine Forbes
 Horatio C. Forjohn
 Donald Forrer
 Karl Fortess
 Magnus Fossum
 Sydney Glen Fossum
 Charles Foster
 Alice Fowler
 David Fredenthal
 Herbert Frere
 Aline Fruhauf
 Rowena Fry
 Fritz Fuglister
 Lily Furedi

G

 Michael J. Gallagher
 Paul H. Galvin
 Richard Galvin
 Emil Ganso
 Charles R. Gardner
 Leon Garland
 Adams Wirt Garrett
 Oronzo Gasparo
 Lee Gatch
 Helen Gaulois
 Gus Gay
 Marion Gaylord
 Amelia Geiger
 Todros Geller
 Aaron Gelman
 Enrico Gerbi
 Eugenie Gershoy
 Frank Gesner
 Howard Gibbs
 Isolde Therese Gilbert
 John Glenn
 Enrico Glicenstein
 Vincent Glinsky
 Albert Gold
 James L. Goldie
 Minetta Good
 Aaron Goodelman
 Bertram Goodman
 Job Goodman
 Boris Gorelick
 Arshile Gorky
 Harry Gottlieb
 Blanche Grambs
 Morris Graves
 Samuel Green
 Isabelle Greenberger
 Balcomb Greene
 Marion Greenwood
 Laicita Gregg
 John W. Gregory
 Waylande Gregory
 Jack Greitzer
 Nils Gren
 Thayer Grimes
 A. L. Groll
 Elias Mandel Grossman
 Justin C. Gruelle
 Thomas Guidone
 O. Louis Guglielmi
 Alvin Gully
 Philip Guston
 James Guy
 Irving Guyer

H

 Malcolm Hackney
 Edward Hagedorn
 Ernst Halberstadt
 Duane Haley
 Richard Halls
 Edith Hamlin
 Eugene E. Hannan
 Merlin C. Hardy
 Minna Harkavy
 Robert E. Harlow, Jr.
 George E. Harris
 Abraham Harriton
 Ernest H. Hart
 Marsden Hartley
 Walter Hartson
 Vertis Hayes
 Charles Heaney
 Howard Heath
 John P. Heins
 Knute Heldner
 Helen West Heller
 August Henkel
 Ralf Henricksen
 Samuel Hershey
 Edna Hershman
 Harry Herzog
 Magnus Colcord Heurlin
 William Hicks
 Gustave Hildebrand
 Hilaire Hiler
 Carrie Hill
 Willard Newman Hirsch
 Louis Hirshman
 Joseph Hochfeld
 Carl Hoeckner
 William Hoffman
 Raymond J. Holden
 Richard Hood
 Mary Hoover
 Donal Hord
 Axel Horn
 Milton Horn
 Allan Houser
 Joseph Hovell
 Len R. Howard
 Mary Howard
 Stephen Jerome Hoxie
 Torvald Arnst Hoyer
 Arthur G. Hull
 David W. Humphrey
 Frank Hunter
 Anna W. Huntington
 Marion Huse

I

 Edgar Imler
 Eitaro Ishigaki

J

 Mabel Wellington Jack
 Gordena Jackson
 Eli Jacobi
 Abraham Jacobs
 Emanuel Jacobson
 Edward L. Jansen
 Richard Jansen
 Harriet Jenkins
 Leonard Seweryn Jenkins
 Avery Johnson
 Edwin Boyd Johnson
 Sargent Claude Johnson
 Tom Loftin Johnson
William H. Johnson
 Albertus Jones
 James Jones
 Lawrence A. Jones
 Rebecca Field Jones
 Robert M. Jones
 Shirley Julian
 Leonard D. Jungwirth
 Jeno Juszko

K

 Reuben Kadish
 Sheffield Kagy
 Jacob Kainen
 Gerome Kamrowski
 George Kanelous
 Ben Kaplan
 David Karfunkle
 Nat Karson
 William Karp
 Hyman William Katz
 Irving Katzenstein
 Waldo Kaufer
 Andrene Kauffman
 Florence Kawa
 Louis Bertrand Rolston Keeler
 Carl Keksi
 Estelle Kellogg
 Albert Sumter Kelly
 Leon Kelly
 Karl Kelpe
 Paul Kelpe
 Luman P. Kelsey
 Arthur Kerrick
 Dmitri Kessel
 Walt Killam
 Roy E. King
 Troy Kinney
 Georgina Klitgaard
 Gene Kloss
 Karl Knaths
 Edwin B. Knutesen
 Walter Korder
 Saul Kovner
 Benjamin Knotts
 Lee Krasner
 Romuald Kraus
 Erik Hans Krause
 Samuel Kravitt
 Kalman Kubinyi
 Paul Kucharyson
 Webster C. Kullberg
Yasuo Kuniyoshi
 Lawrence Kupferman

L

 Lucien Labaudt
 Louis LaBrecque
 Henry La Cagnina
 Robert Lachenmann
 Bancel La Farge
 Philip Lagana
 Oliver LaGrone
 Arthur Laing
 Robert Lambdin
 Chet La More
 Karl Lang
 Edward Laning
 Michael Lantz
 John LaQuatra
 Omer T. Lassonde
 Sidney Laufman
 Michael Lauretano
 Jacob Lawrence
 Harold Lawson
 Katherine S. Lawson
 Blanche Lazzell
 Tom Lea
 Lawrence Lebduska
 Joseph LeBoit
 William Robinson Leigh
 Harold Lehman
 Michael Lenson
 Julian E. Levi
 Jack Levine
 Herschel Levit
 Josephine Frankel Levy
 Edward Lewandowski
 Jennie Lewis
 Monty Lewis
 Norman Lewis
 Elba Lightfoot
 Ernest Limbach
 Russell Limbach
 Louis Linck
 Richard William Lindsey
 Henry Lion
 Abraham Lishinsky
 Nathaniel Little
 William Littlefield
 George Lloyd
 Lucile Lloyd
 Charles Locke
 Dorothy Loeb
 Michael Loew
 Thomas Gaetano LoMedico
 John Lonergan
 Frank W. Long
 Edward L. Loper, Sr.
 Francisco P. Lord
 Nat Lowell
 Margaret Lowengrund
 Louis Lozowick
 Gabriel Luchetti
 Ryah Ludins
 Helen Lundeberg
 Nan Lurie
 Douglas Lynch
 Matthew Lyons

M

 Guy Maccoy
 Leon Makielski
 William McCracken
 Albert McCutcheon
 Stanton Macdonald-Wright
 Mae McFarland
 Irene McHugh
 Loren MacIver
 Harry Francis Mack
 Bruce McKain
 Aida McKenzie
 William McKillop
 Christopher McLaughlin
 Gregory McLoughlin
 James G. McManus
 George McNeil
 Lewis F. MacRitchie
 Claire Mahl
 Philip Malicoat
 Hans Manglesdorf
 Moissaye Marans
 Conrad Marca-Relli
 David Margolis
 George Marinko
 Kyra Markham
 Jack Markow
 James Marshall
 Margaret Marshall
 Fletcher Martin
 Floyd T. Martin
 Marvin Martin
 Michel Martino
 Mercedes Matter
 John Matulis
 Jan Matulka
 Austin Mecklem
 Clifton Meek
 Dina Melicov
 Paul Meltsner
 Harold Merriam
 Richard Merrick
 Hugh Mesibov
 Guido Metelli
 Herman Meyer
 Casimer Michalczyk
 Anne Michalov
 Katherine Milhous
 Raymond Milici
 Salvatore Milici
 Hugh Miller
 Clarence Millet
 Ed Millman
 A. Reid Mimsey
 Theodore Monaghan
 Edith Dale Monson
 Jo Mora
 F. Townsend Morgan
 Eugene Morley
 Carl Morris
 Eric Mose
 Max Mougel
 Roland Mousseau
 Lloyd Moylan
 Robert Muchley
 William Mues
 Bert Mullins
 Arthur Murphy
 M. Lois Murphy
 Vincent J. Murphy
 Hester Miller Murray

Joseph D. Myers

N

 Frank Nagy
 Helmuth Naumer
 Alice Neel
 Carl Gustaf Nelson
 Ralph Nelson
 Louise Nevelson
 James Michael Newell
 John Nichols
 Spencer Baird Nichols
 Frank S. Nicholson
 Jane Ninas
 Louis Nisanoff
 Ann Nooney
 Henry Allen Nord
 Ernest Ralph Norling
 William Norman
 Lois North
 Frank Nuderscher
 Myron Chester Nutting

O

 Ann Rice O'Hanlon
 Elizabeth Olds
 Frederick E. Olmsted
 Frank Ormansky
 Elliot Orr
 Erel Osborn

P

 Cano Pace
 Willard Paddock
 Anthony Paglinea
 Delos Palmer
 William C. Palmer
 Joseph Pandolfini
 Igor Pantuhoff
 Betty Waldo Parish
 Martin Partyka
 Alfred J. Parys
 Phillip Pavia
 Glenn Pearce
 Albert Pearson
 Augustus Hamilton Peck
 Albert Pels
 Irene Rice Pereira
 Fred Peterson
 Girolamo Piccoli 
 Charles Pollock
 James Arlin Pollock
 Jackson Pollock
 Theodore C. Polos
 Charles Polowetski
 Julius John Pommer
 Charles E. Pont
 Vincent Popolizio
 George Post
 Herbert W. Pratt
 Gregorio Prestopino
 Clayton Sumner Price
 Arnold Pyle
 Leonard Pytlak

Q

 Walter Quirt

R

 Mac Raboy
 Angelo Racioppi
 Joseph Rajer
 Fosden Ransom
 Frank J. Raymond
 Anton Refregier
 Paul Reilly
 Harry R. Rein
 Salvatore Reina
Ad Reinhardt
 Charles Reinike
 Philip Reisman
 Manuel R. Regalado
 Andrée Rexroth
 Misha Reznikoff
 Mischa Richter
 Dan Rico
 James Ridolfo
 Diego Rivera
 José de Rivera
 Jack Rivolta
 Red Robin
 Hugo Robus
 Emanuel Glicen Romano
 Fingal Rosenquist
 Louis Ross
 Sanford Ross
 Girard Rossi
 Vincent Rossi
 Mark Rothko
 Jerome Henry Rothstein
 Peter Rotier
 Albert Ruby
 Joseph Rugolo
 Alexander Rummler
 Rosa Rush 
 Michele Russo
 Dorothy Rutka
 Frank Rutkoski

S

 Charles L. Sallée Jr.
 Paul E. Saling
 Isaac Jacob Sanger
 William Sanger
 Richard Sargent
 Martha Watson Sauer
 Augusta Savage
 Archibald D. Sawyer
 Carl Saxild
 Concetta Scaravaglione
 Joseph Scarrozzo
 Louis Schanker
 Bernard P. Schardt
 Edwin Scheier
 Mary Scheier
 Heinrich Schlichting
 Carl Schmitt
 Arlo Schmitz
 Edward Schoenberger
 Joseph Schork
 George Schreiber
 Earl Schuler
 Lester Schwartz
 Rubin Schwartz
 William S. Schwartz
 Stanley Scott
 Georgette Seabrooke
 Elinor Sears
 Charles Sebree
 Alice Selinkoff
 Alfred A. Sessler
 Alfredo Sever
 Ben Shahn
 Lillian Shaw
 Glenn Sheckels
 Hazel Sheckler
 George Shellhase
 Effim H. Sherman
 Francis Bernard Shields
 Harry Shokler
 Anatol Shulkin
 William Howard Shuster
 Louis B. Siegriest
 Claire Silber
 Lila Sinclair
 William Earl Singer
 Mitchell Siporin
 Arba Skidmore
 Raymond Skolfield
 Henry Skreczko
 John French Sloan
 Thomas O'Connor Sloane
 A. D. Smit
 Erik Johan Smith
 Margery Hoffman Smith
 Marshall Smith
 Phillip Smith
 Yngve Soderberg
 William Sommer 
 Isaac Soyer
 Moses Soyer
 Raphael Soyer
 Russell Speakman
 Max Spivak
 Clay Edgar Spohn
 Ralph Stackpole
 Alexander R. Stavenitz
 Jerome Stavola
 Cesare Stea
 Bernard Joseph Steffen
 Walter Steinhart
 Joseph Stella
 John Stenvall
 Eunice Stephenson
 Harry Sternberg
 Hugh Stevenson
 Elinor Stone
 Frances Strain
 Francis Sullivan
 Charles Frederick Surendorf
 Richard Sussman
 Sakari Suzuki
 Albert Swinden

T

 John Tabaczuk
 Rufino Tamayo
 Chuzo Tamotzu
 Harry LeRoy Taskey
 Jean Taylor
 John W. Taylor
 Elizabeth Terrell
 Victor Thall
 Robert Garret Thew
 Lenore Thomas
 Lars Thorsen
 Dox Thrash
 Charles Winstanley Thwaites
 Francis Thwing
 Archie Tillinghast
 Alton Tobey
 Mark Tobey
 A. J. Tock
 Manuel Tolegian
 Henry W. Tomlinson
 Harry Everett Townsend
 Lee Townsend
 Elizabeth Tracy
 William H. Traher
 Grace A. Treadwell
 Eugene Trentham
 Nahum Tschacbasov
 H. B. Tshudy
 Raymond Turner
 Julius Twohy

U

 Edward Buk Ulreich
 Bumpei Usul
 Frank Utpatel

V

 Jacques Van Aalten
 Joan Van Breeman
 Stuyvesant Van Veen
 Charles Vander Sluis
 Dorothy Varian
 Joseph Vavak
 Anthony Velonis
 Charles Verschuuren
 Cornelia Vetter
 Frede Vidar
 Pauline Vinson
 Joseph Vogel
 Herman Volz
 T. F. Gustave Von Groschwitz
 John Von Wicht

W

 Helen Wagner
 John Wagner
 Theodore Wahl
 Robert C. Wakeman
 John Augustus Walker
 John Walley
 Marion Walton
 Hyman J. Warsager
 Blanche Waterbury
 Herbert Waters
 Albert James Webb
 Roswell Weidner
 James Weiland
 Isadore Weiner
 Rudolph Weisenborn
 Frederick Weiss
 Julius Weiss
 Oscar Weissbuch
 Martin Weitzman
 Howard Weld
 Paul Weller
 Louise Welsh
 Maria Weniger
 George West
 Wayne White
 J. Scott Williams
 Arnold Wiltz
 Andrew Winter
 Ted Witonski
 Stanley Wood
 Rodney Woodson
 Robert Woolsey
 Frederick Wright
 Lloyd William Wulf

X

 Jean Xceron
 Alfredo Ximenez

Y

 Edgar Yaeger
 Basil Yurchenco

Z

 Bernard Zakheim
 Karl Zerbe
 Gyula Zilzer
 Santos Zingale
 William Zorach
 Harold Zussin

Gallery

Notes

References

Federal Art Project artists